Bukta is an English sports clothing brand which was founded in 1879 in Stockport, Cheshire, England. It was also, for much of the 20th Century, a leading brand of tents and camping equipment.

History 
E.R. Buck & Sons was founded in 1879, mainly producing shorts for soldiers fighting in the Boer Wars. In 1884, football team Nottingham Forest was pictured wearing kit produced by Bukta. Later Newcastle United and others were wearing kit made by Bukta.

In 1885, Bukta moved into a new factory at Woodside in Poynton, leased from Lord Vernon, employing fewer than 30 people. It was one of the first companies to produce uniforms for the Scout Movement and Girl Guides and produced underwear and hospital and tropical uniforms for the British Army for the First World War. In 1920, Bucks bought the factory in the sale of the Vernon Estate. In 1923, E.R. Buck and Sons became a limited company; by that time it employed between 130 and 200 people.

In 1943, the factory in Poynton was closed and the company moved to a factory at Brinksway, Stockport. Members of the Buck family ran the company until 1982 when a consortium led by Sir Hugh Fraser purchased it.

Football teams that have worn kits produced by Bukta include Aberdeen, Ajax, Arsenal, Bolton Wanderers, Bradford City, Brighton and Hove Albion, Bristol City, Charlton Athletic, Chelsea, Chesterfield, Crystal Palace, Derby County, Dundee, Dundee United, Everton, Falkirk, Feyenoord, Grimsby Town, Hearts, Hibernian, Huddersfield Town, Hull City, Leicester City, Leyton Orient, Limavady United, Manchester United, Middlesbrough, Millwall, Motherwell, Newcastle United, Nottingham Forest, Plymouth Argyle, Port Vale, Raith Rovers F.C., Rochdale, Rotherham United, Scunthorpe United, Sevilla FC, Sheffield Wednesday, Southend United, Stranraer, Swansea City, Tottenham Hotspur, Vitesse Arnhem, Watford, Wolves, West Ham and Wycombe Wanderers. Rochester Lancers of the second American Soccer League and, later, the North American Soccer League, were also outfitted for a time by Bukta.

In 2005, the Bukta brand was relaunched, having had millions of pounds spent on it, after an absence of more than six years, as a brand for up-market independent stores. Much of Bukta's design and distribution is outsourced to the Cavden Group.

References

External links 
 Bukta Vintage

Sportswear brands
Companies based in Stockport
Companies established in 1879
Sporting goods manufacturers of the United Kingdom